Igreja de Santa Maria do Castelo is a church in Portugal. It is classified as a National Monument.

Churches in Lisbon District
National monuments in Lisbon District
Buildings and structures in Lourinhã